Darkhorn: Realm of the Warlords is a 1985 video game published by The Avalon Hill Game Company.

Gameplay
Darkhorn: Realm of the Warlords is a game in which a battle involving four major fantasy races is played out in a real-time wargame for multiple players.

Reception
Johnny L. Wilson reviewed the game for Computer Gaming World, and stated that "Darkhorn is a fast-paced strategy game which is ideal for getting the gang (or the family) together for an evening's entertainment. Challenge, depth, and interest level make this a product to contend with for many years."

References

External links
Review in Commodore Magazine
Review in RUN magazine
Review in Ahoy!

1985 video games
Apple II games
Avalon Hill video games
Commodore 64 games
Fantasy video games
Real-time strategy video games
Video games developed in the United States